Souls of Sin is a 1949 American race film written and directed by Powell Lindsay, and produced by William D. Alexander.

One of the last of its kind, Souls of Sin has been described as a landmark film of the genre. Generally regarded as the last all-black film with a black producer, it was producer Alexander's final feature before his move to London, where he began making documentaries (he produced one further film with The Klansman in the 1970s).

Plot

Cast 
 Savannah Churchill as Regina
 Powell Lindsay as Bad Boy George
 William Greaves as Isaiah "Alabama" Lee
 Jimmy Wright as Dollar Bill
 Emery Richardson as Roberts
 Billie Allen as Etta
 Louise Jackson as Mrs. Sands
 Charley Macrae as Mac

Music 
Songs featured in the film include:
 "The Things You Do to Me" – Savannah Churchill and Henry Glover
 "Disappointment Blues” – William Greaves
 “Lonesome Blues” – William Greaves

Release 
Souls of Sin screened at the 1989 Galveston Film Festival.

References

External links
 Souls of Sin (1949), IMDb
 
 
 

1949 films
American black-and-white films
1949 drama films
American drama films
American crime films
1940s crime films
Race films
1940s English-language films
1940s American films